Kallah Sakan or Kalleh Sakan may refer to:
 Kallah Sakan, Chabahar
 Kallah Sakan, Khash